In Greek mythology, Polynices (also Polyneices) was the son of Oedipus and either Jocasta or Euryganeia and the older brother of Eteocles (according to Sophocles' "Oedipus at Colonus"). When his father, Oedipus, was discovered to have killed his father and married his mother, he was expelled from Thebes, leaving his sons Eteocles and Polynices to rule. Because of a curse put on them by their father Oedipus, the two sons did not share the rule peacefully and died as a result, killing each other in battle for control over Thebes.

Mythology

Oedipus's curse

In the Thebaid, the brothers were cursed by their father for their disrespect towards him on two occasions.  The first of these occurred when they served him using the silver table of Cadmus and a golden cup, which he had forbidden.  The brothers then sent him the haunch of a sacrificed animal, rather than the shoulder, which he deserved.  Enraged, Oedipus prayed to Zeus that the brothers would die by each other's hand.  However, in Sophocles' Oedipus at Colonus, Oedipus desired to stay in Thebes but was expelled by Creon.  His sons argued over the throne, but Eteocles gained the support of the Thebans and expelled Polynices, who went to Oedipus to ask for his blessing to retake the city, but instead was cursed to die by his brother's hand. His son was Thersander.

Quarrel over the rule of Thebes
There are several accounts of how Eteocles and Polynices shared the rule after Oedipus' departure from the city. In Hellanicus' account, Eteocles offers his brother his choice of either the rule of the city or a share of the property.  In Pherekydes, however, Eteocles expels Polynices by force, and keeps the rule of Thebes and the inheritance.   The Bibliotheca and Diodorus state that the brothers agree to divide the kingship between them, switching each year.  Eteocles, however, was allotted the first year, and refused to surrender the crown.

Eteocles then has his brother exiled, though Polynices soon finds refuge in the city of Argos. There he is welcomed by the king, Adrastus who gives him his daughter, Argia, for his wife. Polynices then pleads his case to King Adrastus, requesting his help to restore him to the throne of Thebes. Adrastos promises to do so and to that end sets out to gather an expeditionary force to march against Thebes. He appoints seven individual champions to lead this assault, one for each of the seven gates in the walls of the city. Together, these champions, including Adrastus and Polynices, are known as the “Seven Against Thebes”. The expedition soon proved to be complete disaster, as all of the Argive champions (save for Adrastus) were slain in the ensuing battle; Polynices and Eteocles face off against one another in single combat and kill each other.

Ten years after Polynices' death, the sons of the seven fallen champions gathered to launch a second assault against the city of Thebes to avenge the deaths of their fathers; they are the known as the Epigoni. Unlike their fathers before them, these Epigoni are successful in their attempt to take Thebes, after which they install Thersander, Polynices' son by Argia, as the city's new ruler.

Burial

In Sophocles' tragedy Antigone, Polynices' story continues after his death. King Creon, who ascended to the throne of Thebes, decreed that Polynices was not to be buried or even mourned, on pain of death by stoning. Antigone, his sister, defied the order, but was caught. Creon decreed death, this in spite of her betrothal to his son Haemon. Antigone's sister, Ismene, then declared she had aided Antigone and wanted the same fate. Creon imprisoned Antigone in a sepulchre; meanwhile the gods, through the blind prophet Tiresias, expressed their disapproval of Creon's decision, which convinced him to rescind his order. He then went to bury Polynices himself, and release Antigone. However, she had already hanged herself rather than be buried alive. When Creon arrived at the tomb where she was to be interred, his son Haemon made as if to attack him and then killed himself.  When Creon's wife, Eurydice, was informed of their deaths, she took her own life.

Genealogy

See also
 Epigoni
The Thebans

References

Theban kings
Kings in Greek mythology
Characters in Seven against Thebes
Theban characters in Greek mythology